Alexander Gottfried (born 5 July 1985 in Nettetal) is a German former professional cyclist.

Major results
2005
 1st Stage 7 Tour de l'Avenir
 2nd Road race, National Under-23 Road Championships
2007
 1st Stage 1 Giro delle Regioni

References

External links

1985 births
Living people
German male cyclists
People from Viersen (district)
Sportspeople from Düsseldorf (region)
Cyclists from North Rhine-Westphalia
21st-century German people